Tara Burns is an Irish judge who has served as a Judge of the High Court since June 2018. She was formerly a barrister specialising in criminal law and has continued to focus on criminal trials as a judge. She was the chairperson of the Referendum Commission for a 2019 referendum on divorce.

Early life 
Burns was born in Hamilton, Canada , grew up in Sligo, Ireland and attended Mercy College there. She obtained a BCL from University College Dublin in 1993.

Legal career 
Burns was a barrister from 1995 and became a senior counsel in 2013. She frequently appeared in criminal cases for both defendants and the Director of Public Prosecutions. She appeared on behalf of the Garda Commissioner at the Morris Tribunal in 2002 and represented Superintendent Dave Taylor at the Disclosures Tribunal. She also often practised on the Midland and Northern Circuits.

Judicial career 
Burns was appointed a judge of the High Court on 28 June 2018. She has heard cases involving sexual offences and homicide.

In November 2018, she was assigned to the Special Criminal Court. She was the judge in charge of the Asylum List of the High Court in 2020.

She was appointed as chairperson of the Referendum Commission in February 2019 for the May 2019 referendum to amend the Constitution. Burns attended events around Ireland to promote voter participation in the referendum, including a ceremony to confer Irish citizenship on 2,500 people. The Commission spent €2.34 million. Burns endorsed the idea of having a permanent electoral commission and modernising the voter registration system.

References

Living people
High Court judges (Ireland)
Alumni of University College Dublin
People from Sligo (town)
Irish women judges
Year of birth missing (living people)
Chairpersons of the Referendum Commission
Alumni of King's Inns